Mary Elizabeth Groom (17 December 1903 – 21 December 1958) was a British artist, notable for her work as a printmaker and for the books she illustrated in the 1930s for the Golden Cockerel Press.

Biography
Groom was born at Corringham in Essex to a master mariner and his wife. She studied under the influential printmaker Claude Flight at the Grosvenor School of Modern Art before, in 1921, enrolling at Leon Underwood's Brook Green School to develop her skills as an engraver. Groom's prints featured areas of black outlined in white but with great attention to detail. In 1937 she produced two books for the Golden Cockerel Press, an edition of Paradise Lost by Milton and Roses of Sharon, a collection of Old Testament verses.

Groom was a member of the Society of Wood Engravers, exhibiting some 18 prints with them, and also of a breakaway group, the English Wood Engraving Society.

For many years she lived at Southwold before moving to Wenhaston in Suffolk, which was still her home when she died in 1958 in Norwich. Fourteen prints by Groom are held by the Ashmolean Museum in Oxford and both the Victoria and Albert Museum in London and the Auckland Art Gallery in New Zealand also have examples of her work, while the British Museum collection includes two of her prints.

References

1903 births
1958 deaths
20th-century English painters
20th-century English women artists
Alumni of the Grosvenor School of Modern Art
English illustrators
English women painters
People from Corringham, Essex